Simmons House may refer to:
William Adam Simmons House, Half Moon Bay, CA, listed on the NRHP in California
Merrick-Simmons House, Fernandina Beach, FL, listed on the NRHP in Florida
Wirick-Simmons House, Monticello, FL, listed on the NRHP in Florida
Simmons House (Cave Spring, Georgia), Cave Spring, GA, listed on the NRHP in Georgia
William S. Simmons Plantation, Cave Spring, GA, listed on the NRHP in Georgia
Simmons-Cullars House, Lincolnton, GA, listed on the NRHP in Georgia
James B. Simmons House, Toccoa, GA, listed on the NRHP in Georgia
John P. Simmons House, Des Moines, IA, listed on the NRHP in Iowa
Simmons House (Richmond, Kentucky), Richmond, KY, listed on the NRHP in Kentucky
Warren-Guild-Simmons House, Jackson, MS, listed on the NRHP in Mississippi
Simmons House (Magnolia, Mississippi), Magnolia, MS, listed on the NRHP in Mississippi
Simmonsen's House, Lodge Grass, MT, listed on the NRHP in Montana
Simmons Stone House, Colonie, NY, listed on the NRHP in New York
Van Denbergh-Simmons House, Colonie, NY, listed on the NRHP in New York
Stephen Simmons House, Hounsfield, NY, listed on the NRHP in New York
Alton Simmons House, Syracuse, NY, listed on the NRHP in Syracuse, New York
Foscue and Simmons Plantations, Pollocksbille, NC, listed on the NRHP in North Carolina
Edwin H. Simmons House, Perrysburg, OH, listed on the NRHP in Ohio
Hood-Simmons House, Perrysburg, OH, listed on the NRHP in Ohio
Louis B. Simmons House, Duncan, OK, listed on the NRHP in Oklahoma
Simmons-Edwards House, Charleston, SC, listed on the NRHP in South Carolina
Robert Simmons House, Frogmore, SC, listed on the NRHP in South Carolina
Simmons-Harth House, Lexington, SC, listed on the NRHP in South Carolina
Simmons House (Aberdeen, South Dakota), Aberdeen, SD, listed on the NRHP in South Dakota
Peter Simmons House, Winchester, TN, listed on the NRHP in Tennessee
Simmons Island Beach House, Kenosha, WI, listed on the NRHP in Wisconsin
Simmons Ranch, Fruitland, UT, listed on the NRHP in Utah
Simmons-Sebrell-Camp House, Courtland, VA, listed on the NRHP in Virginia